Charles William E. Harmer (born January 18, 1937) is a Canadian politician. He served in the Legislative Assembly of New Brunswick from 1974 to 1987, as a Progressive Conservative member for the constituency of Petitcodiac.

References

1937 births
Living people
Politicians from Saint John, New Brunswick
Progressive Conservative Party of New Brunswick MLAs